The Ord curl snake (Suta ordensis) is a species of snake in the family Elapidae. It is endemic to Australia and native to the catchments of Ord and Victoria Rivers in the northern borderland region between Northern Territory and Western Australia. It occurs in tropical, seasonally dry woodlands and grasslands.

Ord curl snake is venomous.

References

Suta
Snakes of Australia
Reptiles of the Northern Territory
Reptiles of Western Australia
Endemic fauna of Australia
Reptiles described in 1964
Taxa named by Glen Milton Storr